The 2016 United States Senate election in Wisconsin was held November 8, 2016, to elect a member of the United States Senate to represent the State of Wisconsin, concurrently with the 2016 U.S. presidential election, as well as other elections to the United States Senate in other states and elections to the United States House of Representatives and various state and local elections. The primaries were held August 9, 2016.

Incumbent Republican Senator Ron Johnson was re-elected to a second term in office. Former U.S. Senator Russ Feingold, whom Johnson unseated in the 2010 midterm elections, sought a rematch for a fourth non-consecutive term in office but was again defeated by Johnson, who became the first Republican to win a Senate election in Wisconsin during a presidential election year since Bob Kasten in 1980. Kasten was ultimately unseated by Feingold in 1992. Johnson's victory was considered an upset as most polling had Feingold in the lead, coinciding with Donald Trump's own surprise victory in the state's presidential contest.

Background
In 2010, then-incumbent Democratic Senator Russ Feingold ran for re-election to a fourth term in 2010 but was defeated by Republican nominee Ron Johnson.

In March 2013, Johnson announced that he had begun fundraising for his campaign. At that time, he had just $1,529 remaining in his campaign account after raising $16.1 million for the 2010 election, over half of which he self-funded. Johnson said in November 2014 that he would not self-finance another campaign, saying: "I made my $9 million investment in this country. I gave it once, I don't think I should do it again." On May 14, 2015, Feingold announced he would run to win back his former Senate seat. Ultimately, Feingold spent over $24 million on the campaign and ended up with more remaining cash than Johnson, who spent only $20 million.

After the Republicans took control of the Senate following the 2014 Senate elections, the election in Wisconsin was seen by many as a top target for the Democrats, who hoped to retake their majority in the traditionally blue state. Politico pointed to Johnson's "worrisome" favorability ratings as one of the main reasons for his vulnerability. A March 2014 Marquette University Law School poll found that just 29% of voters had a favorable opinion of him.

Republican primary

Candidates

Declared 
 Ron Johnson, incumbent U.S. Senator

Democratic primary

Candidates

Declared 
 Russ Feingold, former U.S. Senator, and former U.S. Special Envoy for the African Great Lakes and the Congo-Kinshasa
 Scott Harbach, perennial candidate

Declined 
 Mary Burke, businesswoman, member of the Madison school district board, former Wisconsin Secretary of Commerce and nominee for Governor of Wisconsin in 2014
 Chris Larson, state senator
 Ron Kind, U.S. Representative
 Gwen Moore, U.S. Representative
 Mark Pocan, U.S. Representative

Results

Libertarian primary

Candidates

Declared 
 Phil Anderson, chair of the Dane County, Wisconsin Libertarian Party and nominee for the State Assembly in 2014

General election

Candidates 
 Ron Johnson (R), incumbent U.S. Senator
 Russ Feingold (D), former U.S. Senator, and former U.S. Special Envoy for the African Great Lakes and the Congo-Kinshasa
 Phil Anderson (L), chair of the Dane County, Wisconsin Libertarian Party and nominee for the State Assembly in 2014

Debates

Endorsements

Predictions

Polling

^ Internal poll taken for Ron Johnson.

with Mary Burke

with Mark Pocan

with Gwen Moore

with Ron Kind

Results

By congressional district
Johnson won 6 of 8 congressional districts, including the Democratic held 3rd.

Notes

References

External links 
Official campaign websites (Archived)
 Ron Johnson (R) for Senate
 Russ Feingold (D) for Senate
 Phil Anderson (L) for Senate

Wisconsin
2016
2016 Wisconsin elections